Łomnica may refer to:

 Łomnica, Jelenia Góra County in Lower Silesian Voivodeship (south-west Poland)
 Łomnica, Wałbrzych County in Lower Silesian Voivodeship (south-west Poland)
 Łomnica, Zgorzelec County in Lower Silesian Voivodeship (south-west Poland)
 Łomnica, Lublin Voivodeship (east Poland)
 Łomnica, Garwolin County in Masovian Voivodeship (east-central Poland)
 Łomnica, Siedlce County in Masovian Voivodeship (east-central Poland)
 Łomnica, Czarnków-Trzcianka County in Greater Poland Voivodeship (west-central Poland)
 Łomnica, Nowy Tomyśl County in Greater Poland Voivodeship (west-central Poland)
 Łomnica, Opole Voivodeship (south-west Poland)
 Łomnica, tributary of Bóbr a river tributary of Bóbr river
 Łomnica, tributary of Nysa Kłodzka a river tributary of Nysa Kłodzka river
 Łomnica, tributary of Dniestr a river tributary of Dniestr river

See also 
 Lomnica
 Lomnice (disambiguation)